Keith Rodney Baylis (born 5 November 1947 in Redditch, Worcestershire) is an English former cricketer who played six first-class games for Worcestershire in the 1960s.

After a number of appearances in the second team during 1965, Baylis made his first-class debut against Cambridge University in June 1966. He took four wickets in the match (the first being that of Rupert Roopnaraine), but it was not enough for him to keep his place in the side.

In 1967 he played five times, all in June and July, producing a career-best 4-112 against Essex and claiming 3-77 against Sussex a few days later, but John Snow's wicket in the latter game was the last he took: against Derbyshire the following week he bowled only two wicketless overs.

External links
 
 Statistical summary from CricketArchive

1947 births
Living people
Sportspeople from Redditch
English cricketers
Worcestershire cricketers